Aleksei Viktorovich Gorelkin (born 8 November 1983) is a Russian former professional footballer.

Club career
He played in the Russian Football National League for FC Nosta Novotroitsk in 2007.

References

External links
 

1983 births
Sportspeople from Chelyabinsk
Living people
Russian footballers
Association football midfielders
FC Kyzylzhar players
Kazakhstan Premier League players
Russian expatriate footballers
Expatriate footballers in Kazakhstan
Russian expatriate sportspeople in Kazakhstan
FC Nosta Novotroitsk players